Night Thoughts is the seventh studio album by English alternative rock band Suede. Produced by long-time collaborator Ed Buller, the album was released through Warner Music UK on 22 January 2016 to widespread critical acclaim. It was accompanied by a feature film, directed by Roger Sargent. During their 2016 tour the band performed from behind a screen on which Sargent's film was projected during the first half of their set. The album is considered by many critics to be the band's finest work since 1994's Dog Man Star.

Background and production
In January 2014 vocalist Brett Anderson revealed that Suede were in the middle of the writing process for a new album. Anderson mentioned that the band "want to carry on writing and pushing forward, so we're taking it somewhere else now." In March, keyboardist Neil Codling posted that Suede were in the studio recording the follow-up to Bloodsports (2013). The album, which was recorded in London and Brussels, features a full string section. The majority of the album was recorded in Belgium in one session, "record[ing] all the music [...] as one piece". Recording was produced by Ed Buller. The album was initially planned for release in 2015. Anderson explained the band wanted to "go somewhere else with [Night Thoughts], to make something with a bit more scope."

Composition
Codling compared "Outsiders" to the likes of "Trash" and "Beautiful Ones", calling it "a rallying cry for the excluded."

Mat Osman talked about the writing process:

Release
In February 2015 Suede debuted "What I'm Trying to Tell You" live while at the NME Awards. On 7 September, Night Thoughts was announced for release. The band performed the whole album in full on 13 and 14 November 2015 at London Roundhouse. These dates also serve as the premiere of the Night Thoughts film, which played in the background behind the band. The DVD version of the film is included in a special edition of the Night Thoughts LP.

On the press release, director Sargent stated:

On 2 September 2015 the band released a teaser video that was thought to be leading to a new album. Bassist Mat Osman linked to this video from Twitter with the caption "It begins". A trailer for the film and the album was released on 7 September. On 24 September, "Outsiders" was made available for streaming. Night Thoughts was released on 22 January 2016. It was promoted with a series of in-store acoustic gigs, including a session at HMV, Oxford Street in London.

The album peaked at no. 6 on the UK Albums Chart; and as of September 2018, has recorded UK sales of 29,117, according to the Official Charts Company.

Critical reception

Night Thoughts received positive reviews from music critics. At Metacritic, which assigns a normalized rating out of 100 to reviews from critics, the album received an average score of 80, which indicates "generally favourable reviews", based on 29 reviews. AllMusic senior critic Stephen Thomas Erlewine praised the album, stating: "With that past behind them, Suede can still dwell on big issues of love and mortality, but now that the past is in perspective, it all means a little bit more and what lies ahead is a little more precious, and that wide view makes Night Thoughts all the more moving." Writing for Exclaim!, Cam Lindsay stated: "Suede establish and uphold the album's gravitas with the type of symphonic grandiosity we've come to anticipate from them." The Guardians Caroline Sullivan praised the album, calling it "another victory for the misfits." Andy Gill of The Independent wrote: "'How long will it take to break the plans that I never make?' It’s a question that was inevitably begged by those previous celebrations of low-rent outlaw glamour, and, in attempting to answer it, Suede may have made their best album." Consequence of Sound'''s John Hadusek thought that the record "finds a middleground between the guitar pop of the Coming Up era and the moodier textures of Dog Man Star," and regarded it as "a fine entry in their already strong discography."Pitchfork critic Stuart Berman was positive in his assessment of the album, stating: "With Night Thoughts Suede once again leap up off the dancefloor to swing from the chandeliers." Berman further stated that the record "isn’t a rock opera per se, though it gamely assumes the form of one." The Quietus Luke Turner thought that musically, the album "is the most solid and focussed-sounding album Suede have ever realised" and commented: "It certainly is the sound of a band stepping out of their own shadow to finally be all they can be." Rachel Brodsky of Spin wrote: "Night Thoughts honors Suede’s longstanding place in Brit-rock history as theatrical brooders with a penchant for pop and post-punk, while also celebrating the five-piece’s growth by supplying listeners with another round of swirling dance ballads and operatic, Dog Man Star-ry ruminations." Rolling Stones Ashley Zlatopolsky described the record as the band's "most cohesive album to date, putting a decisively modern twist on their definitive Brit-pop."

Salon included the album in its list of the 14 "criminally underrated albums" of the year. Annie Zaleski felt that, although the album lacked the pop hooks of Bloodsports, the album had its own merits in "rich orchestral flourishes, dramatic guitar arpeggios and vocalist Brett Anderson’s still-pristine, theatrical croon."

Year-end lists

Track listing

Personnel

MusicSuedeBrett Anderson – vocals
Richard Oakes – guitars
Simon Gilbert – drums
Mat Osman – electric bass
Neil Codling – synthesisers, pianoAdditional musiciansOli Langford – strings arrangement; violin and viola 
Danny Keane – cello 
Tom Fry – double bass 
James Mainwaring – baritone saxophone 
Gita Langley – additional vocals 
 Abdallah, Damiano, Bram, Isobel, Ella, Katy, Lottie, Clare, Celine, Sylvie, Daisy, Megan and Thalia of Malorees Junior School, Kilburn – additional vocals TechnicalEd Buller – production
Andy Hughes – engineering
Paul-Edouard Laurendeau – engineering
Joel M. Peters – engineering assistance
Neil Codling – additional production
Cenzo Townshend – mixing
Tony Cousins – masteringArtwork Paul Khera – art direction, domestic interior photography and design
 Brett Anderson – art direction
 Mat Osman – art direction
 Neil Codling – art direction
 Didz Hammond – art direction
 Lucy Ray – underwater photography

FilmCastAlex Walton as Bryn
Jane E. Walsh as Sasha
Gabe Trimble as Cian
Paul Dewdney as Bryn's father
Tim Parker as Sasha's fatherProduction'''
Roger Sargent – direction
Stephanie De Giorgio – writing
Janna Barlett – executive production
Callum Gordon – executive production
Alex Ashman – production
Elena Carmen – editing
Gabi Norland – direction of photography
Eric Hart – camera assistance
Anna Balchin – production assistance
Claire Warr – production assistance

Charts

References

External links
 

2016 albums
Albums produced by Ed Buller
Suede (band) albums
Concept albums
Warner Music Group albums